The Samsung Galaxy S Plus or Samsung Galaxy S 2011 Edition is an Android smartphone, introduced July 2011.

The Galaxy S Plus features the Qualcomm Snapdragon S2 MSM8255T chipset with a 1.4 GHz Qualcomm Scorpion processor which is faster than the original Samsung Galaxy S and is accompanied by the Adreno 205 (enhanced) GPU which is slightly slower than the PowerVR SGX540.

It originally came with Android 2.3, but it can be upgraded officially to Android 2.3.6. The device also unofficially supports CyanogenMod versions up to 12.1 (Android 5.1). The device's processor can be also overclocked up to 1.8 GHz with a custom kernel.

See also 
 Comparison of Samsung Galaxy S smartphones
 Samsung Galaxy S series

References

External links 
 All Galaxy S Plus related development (XDA-Developers)
 Samsung Galaxy S Plus Jelly Bean 
 Unlock Samsung i9001

Android (operating system) devices
Galaxy S Plus
Galaxy S Plus
Mobile phones introduced in 2011